East Baltic may refer to:
the eastern Baltic region
the East Baltic languages, a subset of the Baltic languages
historically, in physical anthropology, the East Baltic race